The discography of Josh Pyke, an Australian singer-songwriter, consists of seven studio albums, six extended plays, and thirty-six singles.

Studio albums

Live albums

Compilation albums

Extended plays

Singles

As lead artist

As featured artist

Songwriting credits

References

Pyke, Josh